France Martineau is a professor and a Canadian linguist. 
Martineau is an expert in Canadian French linguistics and considered a leader in historical sociolinguistics as well as a pioneer in the digital humanities.
Martineau presently holds the University of Ottawa Research Chair Le français en mouvement: Frontières, réseaux et contacts en Amérique française.

Marineau currently works at the University of Ottawa in Ontario, Canada, assigned to both the Linguistics Department and the French Department.

Biography and achievements 

France Martineau was the director of the project Modéliser le changement : les voies du français, from 2005 to 2010, funded by the Major Collaborative Research Initiatives (MCRI) of the Social Sciences and Humanities Research Council (SSHRC). This project, initiated by Dr Martineau, has been involved with the development of digitized corpora that have supported numerous research activities and conferences worldwide in the field of French historical sociolinguistics.

Professor Martineau is one of very few researchers to obtain a second MCRI grant.  On March 16, 2011 at the University of Ottawa, in the company of such distinguished guests as Member of Parliament Royal Galipeau and the President of the University, Allan Rock, it was officially announced that Dr Martineau had been awarded $2.5 million in research funding for the international and interdisciplinary project Le français à la mesure d'un continent: un patrimoine en partage. Mr Rock stressed the importance of this project, which will enhance Canada's standing as a leader in international research on the French language.

France Martineau is editor of the Voies du français collection published by the Presses de l'Université Laval, and has been president of the Canadian Linguistics Association since 2011 (vice-president since 2009).

She manages the Laboratoire des Polyphonies, where students have the opportunity to learn and apply new skills.

Publications 
Martineau, France (2019). Ressacs. Éditions Sémaphore. Roman
Martineau, France, Annette Boudreau, Yves Frenette, Françoise Gadet (2018). Francophonies nord-américaines: langues, frontières et idéologies, Québec, Presses de l'Université Laval, 554p.
Frenette, Yves and France Martineau (2018). Les Voyages de Charles Morin, charpentier canadien-français. Texte établi par France Martineau, Québec, Presses de l'Université Laval, 580p.
 Martineau, France and Raymond Mougeon (2003). « Sociolinguistic Research on the Origins of ne Deletion in European and Quebec French » Language, Vol. 79, No. 1, pp. 118–152.
 Martineau, France and Marcel Bénéteau (2010). Incursion dans le Détroit. Édition critique du Jour Naille Commansé Le 29. octobre 1765 pour Le voiage que je fais au Mis a Mis, Quebec City, Presses de l’Université Laval, 
 Martineau, France et Terry Nadasdi (2011). Le français en contact. Hommages à Raymond Mougeon, Québec, Presses de l’Université Laval, 
 Lusignan, Serge, France Martineau, Yves Charles Morin et Paul Cohen (2012). L'introuvable unité du français. Contacts et variations linguistiques en Europe et en Amérique (XIIe-XVIIIe siècle), Québec, Presses de l’Université Laval, 
 Martineau, France (2016). Bonsoir la muette. Éditions Sémaphore. Récit
 Martineau France (2016). « Écrire la parole entravée », dans Jo Ann Champagne (dir.) Une incorrigible passion, Montréal, Fides, p. 113-134. Nouvelle

Honours and distinctions 
 In 2004, Professor Martineau was named Professor of the Year by the Faculty of Arts at the University of Ottawa.
 In 2009, she was named one of "16 extraordinary women" at the University of Ottawa.
 In 2009, she was appointed to the University Research Chair in Language and Migration in French America.
 In 2011, she received funding from the Leaders Opportunity Fund of the Canada Foundation for Innovation (CFI).
 In 2011, she was elected a member of the Royal Society of Canada.
 In 2012, she was granted the Excellence in Research Award from the University of Ottawa.
 In 2014, she was appointed to the University of Ottawa Research Le français en mouvement: frontières, réseaux et contacte en Amérique française.
 In 2015, she is conferred the title of Distinguished Professor at the University of Ottawa.
 In 2017, she wins the National Achievement Award 2017 of the Canadian Linguistic Association (ACL).
 In 2018, she is wins the Ordre des francophones d'Amérique du Conseil supérieur de la langue française.
 In 2020, the book L'individu et sa langue Hommages à France Martineau was published in her honour, edited by Wim Remysen et Sandrine Tailleur, Presses de l'Université Laval.
 In 2021, she is conferred the title of Emeritus Professor at the University of Ottawa.

External links 
 Les voies du français (PUL)
 Page web au département de français
 Le monde selon Mathieu, entrevue à Radio-Canada du 1er avril 2011

References 

Linguists from Canada
Academic staff of the University of Ottawa
Living people
Women linguists
Fellows of the Royal Society of Canada
Year of birth missing (living people)